Abel Kipsang Bele (born 22 November 1996) is a Kenyan  middle-distance runner who specializes in the 1500 metres. He placed fourth in the event at the 2020 Tokyo Olympics. Kipsang won the bronze medal at the 2022 World Indoor Championships in Belgrade.

Career
Abel Kipsang gained his first experience at international championships at the 2019 African Games in Rabat, where he finished fourth over the 800 metres in a time of 1:45.43 minutes.

He set a personal best in the 1500 metres of 3:32.6 in Marseille on 9 June 2021, before finishing third on 19 June at the Kenyan Olympic trials to secure his place at the delayed 2020 Tokyo Olympics. His mark from Marseille placed him in the top 10 worldwide. At the Tokyo Games on 5 August, Kipsang set a new Olympic record in the semifinals of the 1500 m with a time of 3:31.65, further improving his personal best. This record was later broken by Jakob Ingebrigtsen who ran 3:28.32 in the final, where Kipsang set a new personal best of 3:29.56 for fourth. Timothy Cheruiyot clinched silver in 3:29.01 while Josh Kerr was third clocking 3:29.05.

In 2022, he became World Indoor Championship bronze medallist in Belgrade, setting a personal best of 3:33.36 and finishing behind Samuel Tefera (3:32.77) and Ingebrigtsen (3:33.02).

Competition record

References

1996 births
Living people
Kenyan male middle-distance runners
Athletes (track and field) at the 2020 Summer Olympics
Olympic athletes of Kenya
Athletes (track and field) at the 2019 African Games
World Athletics Indoor Championships medalists
African Championships in Athletics winners
21st-century Kenyan people